The Algerian National Movement (or MNA, Tamazight: Amussu Aɣelnaw Adzayri) was an organization founded to counteract the efforts of the Front de Libération Nationale (FLN). 

It was founded by veteran nationalist Messali Hadj as a rival to the Front de Libération Nationale (FLN) during the Algerian War of Independence. He was a co-founder and President of the three earlier organizations leading the movement for independence beginning in 1926. However the War of Independence was started November 1954 without him being consulted. The creation of the MNA was his revenge. He found support among Algerian expatriates in France who had idolized him in the past and also among the French authorities. In spite of that, the FLN's armed wing, the Armée de Libération Nationale (ALN), succeeded in destroying the MNA's small armed groups in Algeria early on in the war.
The MNA and FLN also fought each other on French soil in the so-called café wars, resulting in hundreds of casualties, but FLN gradually gained the upper hand.

Control over post-independence Algeria would rest firmly in the hands of the FLN and its military, while the MNA vanished as a political organization.

References

Paul-Marie Atger, "Le Mouvement national algérien à Lyon. Vie, mort et renaissance durant la guerre d'Algérie", Vingtième siècle, revue d'histoire, n° 104, octobre-décembre 2009. 
http://www.cairn.info/revue-vingtieme-siecle-revue-d-histoire-2009-4-p-107.htm

Algerian War
Arab militant groups
Articles containing video clips
Banned political parties in Algeria
Defunct political parties in Algeria
Defunct political parties in France
National liberation movements
Political parties with year of disestablishment missing
Political parties with year of establishment missing
Rebel groups in Algeria
Separatism in Algeria
Separatism in France
Terrorism in France